The Day of Songun is a public holiday in North Korea celebrated on 25 August annually to commemorate the beginning of Kim Jong-il's Songun (military-first) leadership in 1960.

In 2013, Kim Jong-un elevated the holiday to an official status on the North Korean calendar, on par with the Day of the Sun (birth anniversary of Kim Il-sung). Thus it became the holiday associated with Kim Jong-un, with his own birthday still missing from the official calendar. This has helped to further Kim Jong-un's charismatic rule. According to North Korea analyst Adam Cathcart, the purpose of the holiday is "to reinforce Kim Jong-un's legitimacy to rule, confirm the principle of very early succession and young leadership, and emphasize the preternatural military abilities of the sons in the Kim family."

On the calendar, the 25 August holiday takes place after the Liberation Day (15 August) and before the Day of the Foundation of the Republic (9 September). Day of Songun is one of three days celebrating Kim Jong-il on the calendar, the other two being the Day of the Shining Star (his birth anniversary) and Generalissimo Day (commemorating his accession to the rank of Taewonsu).

Background
Songun (military-first) is the political ideology peculiar to North Korea that all problems in society can be corrected by giving priority to military affairs. Its roots are traced to Kim Il-sung's activities during the anti-Japanese struggle of the 1930s, but it is especially identified with Kim Jong-il. Lately, Songun has been associated with Kim Jong-un in his effort balance the interests of the ruling Workers' Party of Korea and the Korean People's Army (KPA). According to Fyodor Tertitskiy, the term has largely lost its original meaning and now simply means anything "good". Consequentially, Day of Songun is not so much about the army as it is about the person of Kim Jong-il.

Until 2005, the history of Kim Jong-il's Songun leadership was presented as having begun on 1 January 1995 with his visit to a guard-post. After 2005, the date was backtracked to 1960 to suggest a much longer held tradition. The Day of Songun commemorates his supposed 25 August 1960 inspection of the Seoul Ryu Kyong Su Guards 105th Tank Division with his father Kim Il-sung. The visit is considered the beginning of his Songun leadership. Although Jong-il would have been 18 then and not yet started his studies at Kim Il-sung University, according to, Tertitskiy, "[t]he date looks right, as it seemingly the date when Kim Jong Il made his first steps up the political ladder".

History

The commemoration was not a major celebration under Kim Jong-il's rule, but there had been annual celebrations even before the holiday was officially instituted. Plans for an official holiday surfaced in 2012, and the Korean Central News Agency (KCNA) reported some celebration of a "Day of Songun" already back then. Kim Jong-un delivered a speech during the 2012 festivities, entitled "Only Victory and Glory Will Be in Store for Us Who are Advancing under the Unfurled Flag Bearing the Immortal Beaming Images of the Great Kim Il Sung and Kim Jong Il".

The next year, on 25 August 2013, Kim Jong-un officially announced the holiday in a long speech, entitled "Let Us Forever Glorify Comrade Kim Jong Il's Great Idea and Achievements of the Military-First Revolution", published in Rodong Sinmun and Joson Inmingun. In it, Kim Jong-un declared:

The next day, 26 August, a decree on instituting the Day of Songun as an annual national holiday was adopted by the Supreme People's Assembly.

Celebrations
The Day of Songun is marked with flying the flag of North Korea, by civilians, and the flag of the Supreme Commander of the KPA by military units. Observances include galas for service people, dancing parties around the country, outdoor concerts, laying bouquets, and visiting historic sites.

See also

Public holidays in North Korea
Songun

References

External links
"Only Victory and Glory Will Be in Store for Us Who are Advancing under the Unfurled Flag Bearing the Immortal Beaming Images of the Great Kim Il Sung and Kim Jong Il" (2012) at the Association for the Study of Songun Politics UK
"Let Us Forever Glorify Comrade Kim Jong Il's Great Idea and Achievements of the Military-First Revolution" (2013) at the Korean Central News Agency

2013 establishments in North Korea
Anniversaries
Annual events in North Korea
August observances
Kim Jong-il
Public holidays in North Korea
Summer events in North Korea